Kwijusa is a Korean Buddhist temple located on Seolbongsan Mountain in Hamju-gun, North Korea. 
It is said to have been established during the reign of King Munjong of Goryeo. 
During the Japanese colonial period, this temple was designated as one of the 31 head temples. The resulting pyramidal hierarchy was supposed to take control over the Korean Buddhism.

Notes

References
  EncyKor 

Buddhist temples in Korea